Beginning in June 2005, Logo TV has been broadcasting programming of interest to the LGBT community. The network broadcasts a blend of original programming and syndicated fare previously broadcast on other networks. Logo offers content from a wide variety of genres, including drama, comedy, reality and documentary. It also airs theatrically released films which have been edited for time and content.

Current

Original programming
Canada's Drag Race
RuPaul's Drag Race (First-run premieres have moved to MTV since January 6, 2023)
RuPaul's Drag Race All Stars (First-run premieres have moved to VH1 after Season 2)
RuPaul's Drag Race: Untucked (Produced for the LogoTVLive website; first runs moved VH1 in 2018)

Syndicated programming
 Bewitched
 The Facts of Life
 Mama's Family
 Married... with Children
 The Nanny
 The New Adventures of Old Christine
 Three's Company
 Will & Grace

Former

Original programs

Other original programming

Reality

Animated

Syndicated/co-produced programs

References

External links

Logo